Stipe Vulikić (born 23 January 2001) is a Croatian professional footballer who plays as a centre-back for Italian  club Perugia on loan from Hrvatski Dragovoljac.

Club career
On 13 July 2022, Vulikić joined Perugia in Italy on a season-long loan with an option to buy. He made his Serie B debut for Perugia on 3 September 2022 in a game against Brescia.

References

External links
 
 

2001 births
Living people
Footballers from Split, Croatia
Association football central defenders
Croatian footballers
Croatia youth international footballers
NK Solin players
NK Hrvatski Dragovoljac players
A.C. Perugia Calcio players
First Football League (Croatia) players
Croatian Football League players
Serie B players
Croatian expatriate footballers
Expatriate footballers in Italy
Croatian expatriate sportspeople in Italy